Richard Rushton (18 September 1902 – 1981) was an English footballer who made 62 appearances in the Football League playing for Lincoln City, Barnsley, Bury and Swindon Town. He played as a wing half or centre half.

Rushton began his career playing non-league football for Bloxwich Strollers and Willenhall Swifts in his native Staffordshire before joining Lincoln City. After a little more than a season, he joined Sheffield Wednesday, but never represented them in senior competition. He then spent a short spell with Barnsley and returned to non-league with Wombwell and Connah's Quay & Shotton, with whom he won the 1928–29 Welsh Cup, defeating Cardiff City 3–0 in the final. A return to the Football League with Bury and Swindon Town preceded the end of his career back in non-league with Wellington Town.

References

1902 births
1981 deaths
People from Willenhall
English footballers
Association football wing halves
Bloxwich Strollers F.C. players
Willenhall F.C. players
Lincoln City F.C. players
Sheffield Wednesday F.C. players
Barnsley F.C. players
Wombwell F.C. players
Connah's Quay & Shotton F.C. players
Bury F.C. players
Swindon Town F.C. players
Telford United F.C. players
English Football League players
Midland Football League players